The Rural Municipality of Cote No. 271 is a rural municipality (RM) in the Canadian province of Saskatchewan within Census Division No. 9 and  Division No. 4.

History 
The RM of Cote No. 271 incorporated as a rural municipality on December 12, 1910.

Geography

Communities and localities 
The following urban municipalities are surrounded by the RM.

Towns
 Kamsack

Villages
 Togo

The following unincorporated communities are within the RM.

Organized hamlets
 Runnymede

Localities
 Cote
 Kamsack Beach
 Ministik Beach

Demographics 

Attractions 
 Duck Mountain Provincial Park
 Shellmouth Reservoir
 Madge Lake
 Kamsack & District Museum

Government 
The RM of Cote No. 271 is governed by an elected municipal council and an appointed administrator that meets on the second Wednesday of every month. The reeve of the RM is Jim Tomochko while its administrator is Sherry Guenther. The RM's office is located in Kamsack.

Transportation 
 Saskatchewan Highway 5
 Saskatchewan Highway 8
 Saskatchewan Highway 57
 Saskatchewan Highway 357
 Saskatchewan Highway 369
 Canadian National Railway
 Kamsack Airport

See also 
List of rural municipalities in Saskatchewan

References 

C

Division No. 9, Saskatchewan